7-Methylguanine is a modified purine nucleobase.  It is a methylated version of guanine. The 7-methylguanine nucleoside is called 7-methylguanosine. However, the free 7-methylguanine base is not involved in the synthesis of nucleotides and not incorporated directly into nucleic acids. 7-Methylguanine is a natural inhibitor of poly (ADP-ribose) polymerase (PARP) and tRNA guanine transglycosylase (TGT) - and thus may exert anticancer activity. For example, it was demonstrated that 7-methylguanine could accelerate apoptotic death of BRCA1-deficient breast cancer cells induced by cisplatin and doxorubicin.

References

Nucleobases
Purines